Georges Guelzec (born 22 October 1947) is a French gymnast. He competed in eight events at the 1972 Summer Olympics. He is the father of Olympic gymnast Fabrice Guelzec.

Guelzec was president of the European Union of Gymnastics from 2010 through 2017. He was elected at the 23rd UEG Congress in 2009, replacing Dimitrios Dimitropoulos as president in 2010. In 2013 he was re-elected to a second term which started in 2014.

He announced his candidacy for president of the International Gymnastics Federation in 2015, but lost to Morinari Watanabe in 2016.

References

External links
 
 
 

1947 births
Living people
French male artistic gymnasts
Olympic gymnasts of France
Gymnasts at the 1972 Summer Olympics
Place of birth missing (living people)
20th-century French people